Scott Colley (born November 24, 1963) is an American jazz double bassist and composer. He has performed in bands led by Herbie Hancock, T. S. Monk (jazz drummer), Jim Hall, Andrew Hill, Michael Brecker, Chris Potter, Pat Metheny, Carmen McRae, Edward Simon, Adam Rogers, Brian Blade, David Binney, Antonio Sanchez, Kenny Werner.

Career
Born on November 24, 1963, Colley began studying bass at age 11. At 13, he studied with bassist Monty Budwig. He attended Eagle Rock High School in Los Angeles, where he studied under John Rinaldo. After graduating from high school, he was granted a scholarship to the California Institute for the Arts and studied privately with Charlie Haden and Fred Tinsley (of the Los Angeles Philharmonic). In 1986, he began touring and recording with jazz singer Carmen McRae. After graduating in 1988, he moved to New York City.

Performance history
 1988–89: He performed in U.S. and European tours with Carmen McRae; Dizzy Gillespie; and Clifford Jordan.
 1990–95: Bands included Jim Hall, John Scofield, Joe Henderson and Art Farmer.
 1996–98: His work included touring with a group led by Joe Lovano and Jim Hall, Tours with Toots Thielemans; Bobby Hutcherson; and Bob Berg; extensive touring with Andrew Hill's "Another Point of Departure" sextet.
 2000–04: For five years Colley toured extensively as a member of Herbie Hancock's working trio and two separate quartets (one featuring saxophonist Gary Thomas, the other featuring vibist Bobby Hutcherson) at concerts around the world. Hancock's trio has also performed in concert engagements with symphonic orchestras throughout the United States. During that time he also toured extensively with the Andrew Hill trio and sextet, and the Chris Potter Quartet.
 2005–07: Extensive touring with "Directions in Music", a collaboration with Michael Brecker, Herbie Hancock, Roy Hargrove and Terri Lyne Carrington; Trio concerts with Pat Metheny; tours with Jim Hall; teaching residencies at The Banff Center, Virginia Commonwealth University, and Vallekilde Denmark, European and U.S. tours with Chris Potter's Quartet; concerts with Chris Potter and Antonio Sanchez; U.S and European tours with his own trio and quartet.
 2006-07: Extensive touring with his own quartet and trio. Recordings include projects with Chris Potter; Luciana Souza; Abbey Lincoln; Adam Rogers; Donny McCaslin; two recordings with Kenny Werner; and his own release Architect of the Silent Moment (featuring: Ralph Alessi, David Binney, Craig Taborn, Jason Moran, Adam Rogers, Gregoire Maret, and Antonio Sanchez.)
 2008–10: Touring with his quartet and trio in the US, Europe and South America; also touring with Edward Simon and Brian Blade; Chris Potter's Underground; The Antonio Sanchez Quartet; Magic Circle (a trio with Dave Douglas and Mark Feldman); The David Binney Quartet (with Craig Taborn and Brian Blade); The Kenny Werner Quintet. Teaching residencies in the U.S. and Europe. He worked on numerous recordings, including his seventh CD as a leader, entitled Empire, made up entirely of original compositions, released on the CAM Jazz label during the summer of 2010, featuring Bill Frisell, Ralph Alessi, Brian Blade and Craig Taborn.

Discography

As leader
 Portable Universe (Free Lance, 1996)
 Subliminal... (Criss Cross, 1997)
 This Place (SteepleChase, 1998)
 The Magic Line (ArtistShare, 2000)
 Initial Wisdom (Palmetto, 2002)
 Architect of the Silent Moment (CAM Jazz, 2007)
 Empire (CAM Jazz, 2010)
 Seven (ArtistShare, 2017)

As sideman
With David Binney
 The Luxury of Guessing (AudioQuest, 1995)
 Free to Dream (Mythology, 1998)
 Afinidad (Red, 2001)
 South (ACT, 2001)
 Welcome to Life (Mythology, 2004)
 Oceanos (Criss Cross, 2007)
 Third Occasion (Mythology, 2009)

With Harold Danko
 Next Age (SteepleChase, 1994)
 New Autumn (SteepleChase, 1996)
 The Feeling of Jazz (SteepleChase, 1996)
 Tidal Breeze (SteepleChase, 1997)
 Stable Mates (SteepleChase, 1998)
 Nightscapes (SteepleChase, 2000)

With Jim Hall
 Dialogues (Telarc, 1995)
 Panorama: Live at the Village Vanguard (Telarc, 1997)
 Textures (Telarc, 1997)
 By Arrangement (Telarc, 1998)
 Jim Hall & Basses (Telarc, 2001)
 Downbeat Critic's Choice (Telarc, 2002)
 Magic Meeting (ArtistShare, 2004)
 Hemispheres (ArtistShare, 2008)

With Andrew Hill
 Dusk (Palmetto, 2000)
 A Beautiful Day (Palmetto, 2002)
 The Day the World Stood Still (Stunt, 2003)

With Jazzhole
 The Jazzhole (Bluemoon, 1994)
 Blackburst (Beave Music, 2000)
 Blue 72 (Beave Music, 2014)

With Donny McCaslin
 Seen from Above (Arabesque, 2000)
 The Way Through (Arabesque, 2003)
 Give and Go (Criss Cross, 2006)
 Soar (Sunnyside, 2006)
 In Pursuit (Sunnyside, 2007)
 Declaration (Sunnyside, 2009)
 Brooklyn 3 (Edition Longplay, 2017)

With Judy Niemack
 Long As You're Living (Free Lance, 1990)
 Straight Up (Free Lance, 1993)
 Jazz Singer's Practice Session (GAM, 2004)

With Enrico Pieranunzi
 Permutation (CAM Jazz, 2012)
 Stories (CAM Jazz, 2014)
 New Spring (CAM Jazz, 2016)

With Chris Potter
 Concentric Circles (Concord, 1994)
 Vertigo (Concord, 1998)
 This Will Be (Storyville, 2001)
 Gratitude (Verve, 2001)
 Traveling Mercies (Verve, 2002)
 Lift: Live at the Village Vanguard (Sunnyside, 2004) 
 Song for Anyone (Sunnyside, 2007) 
 Imaginary Cities (ECM, 2015) 

With Adam Rogers
 Art of the Invisible (Criss Cross, 2002)
 Allegory (Criss Cross, 2003)
 Apparitions (Criss Cross, 2005)
 Time and the Infinite (Criss Cross, 2007)

With Alex Sipiagin
 Images (TCB, 1998)
 Steppin' Zone (Criss Cross, 2001)
 Equilibrium (Criss Cross, 2004)
 Returning (Criss Cross, 2005)
 Prints (Criss Cross, 2007)
 Out of the Circle (ArtistShare, 2007)
 Overlooking Moments (Criss Cross, 2013)

With Steve Slagle
 The Steve Slagle Quartet (SteepleChase, 1993)
 Spread the Word (SteepleChase, 1995)
 Alto Blue (SteepleChase, 1997)
 Dedication (Panorama 2018)

With Dave Stryker
 Nomad (SteepleChase, 1995)
 The Greeting (SteepleChase, 1996)
 All the Way (SteepleChase, 1998)

With others
 Rez Abbasi, Third Ear (Cathexis, 1995)
 Thana Alexa, Ode to Heroes (Jazz Village, 2014)
 David Ake, Bridges (Posi-Tone, 2013)
 Joey Alexander, Joey.Monk.Live! (Motema 2017)
 Helio Alves, It's Clear (Reservoir, 2009)
 Franco Ambrosetti, Long Waves (Unit, 2019)
 Lynne Arriale, Melody (TCB, 1999)
 Rebekka Bakken, Daily Mirror (Material, 2000)
 Dick Berk, More Birds Less Feathers (Discovery, 1986)
 Stefano Bollani, Les Fleurs Bleues (Label Bleu, 2001)
 Gary Burton, Common Ground (Mack Avenue, 2011)
 Gary Burton, Guided Tour (Mack Avenue, 2013)
 Thomas Chapin, Never Let Me Go Quartets '95 & '96 (Playscape, 2012)
 Bill Charlap, Souvenir (Criss Cross, 1995)
 Nels Cline, Currents, Constellations (Blue Note, 2018)
 Julian Coryell, Jazzbo (Venus, 1995)
 Julian Coryell, Without You (Venus, 1996)
 Sylvie Courvoisier, Birdies for Lulu (Intakt, 2014)
 Sinne Eeg, Dreams (Stunt, 2017)
 Peter Epstein, Old School (MA, 2001)
 Domenico Ferrari, 3 (Straight Ahead, 1999)
 Joel Frahm, The Navigator (Palmetto, 2000)
 Jon Gordon, The Jon Gordon Quartet (Chiaroscuro, 1992)
 Juliette Greco, Le Temps D'Une Chanson (Polydor, 2006)
 Roy Hargrove, Diamond in the Rough (Novus/RCA, 1990)
 Kevin Hays, El Matador (Jazz City, 1991)
 Fred Hersch, Forward Motion (Chesky, 1991)
 Bendik Hofseth, XI (Grappa, 2009)
 Christopher Hollyday, And I'll Sing Once More (Novus 1992)
 Mike Holober, Canyon (Sons of Sound, 2003)
 David Kikoski, The Maze (Criss Cross, 1999)
 Joachim Kuhn, Universal Time (EmArcy, 2002)
 Julian Lage, Arclight (Mack Avenue, 2016)
 Julian Lage, Modern Lore (Mack Avenue, 2018)
 Abbey Lincoln, Abbey Sings Abbey (Verve, 2007)
 Rick Margitza, Heart of Hearts (Palmetto, 2000)
 Rick Margitza, Memento (Palmetto, 2001)
 Pat Martino, All Sides Now (Blue Note, 1997)
 Mason Brothers, Two Sides One Story (Archival, 2010)
 Maurane, Fais-Moi Une Fleur (Polydor, 2011)
 Kate McGarry, Show Me (Palmetto, 2003)
 Carmen McRae, Any Old Time (Denon, 1986)
 Carmen McRae, New York State of Mind (Victor, 1992)
 Pat Metheny, Jan Garbarek, Gary Burton, Scott Colley, Hommage a Eberhard Weber (ECM, 2015)
 Monday Michiru, My Ever Changing Moods (Geneon, 2008)
 Rale Micic, 3 (CTA, 2009)
 Jane Monheit, The Lovers, the Dreamers and Me (Concord, 2008)
 T.S. Monk, Changing of the Guard (Blue Note, 1993)
 T.S. Monk, The Charm (Blue Note, 1995)
 Wolfgang Muthspiel, Angular Blues (ECM, 2020)
 Greg Osby, The Invisible Hand (Blue Note, 2000)
 Greg Osby, Symbols of Light (Blue Note, 2001)
 Andy Parsons, Fundementia (IGMOD, 1998)
 Ben Perowsky, Ben Perowsky Trio (JazzKey Music, 1999)
 Dave Pietro, Now Becoming Then (A Records, 1999)
 Dave Pietro, Standard Wonder (A Records, 2001)
 Michel Portal, Bailador (Classics & Jazz France 2010)
 Tineke Postma, The Traveller (Etcetera 2009)
 Doug Raney, Back in New York (SteepleChase, 1997)
 Joshua Redman, Still Dreaming  (Nonesuch, 2018)
 Joshua Redman, Sun on Sand (Nonesuch, 2019)
 Tim Ries, Universal Spirits (Criss Cross, 1998)
 Josh Roseman, Cherry (Enja, 2000)
 Ted Rosenthal, Images of Monk (Jazz Alliance, 1993)
 Renee Rosnes, Art & Soul (Blue Note, 1999)
 Antonio Sánchez, Migration  (CAM Jazz, 2007)
 Antonio Sanchez, Live in New York at Jazz Standard (CAM Jazz, 2010)
 Boz Scaggs, Speak Low (Decca, 2008)
 John Scofield, A Moment's Peace (EmArcy, 2011)
 Seatbelts, Cowboy Bebop: Vitaminless (Victor, 1998)
 Brad Shepik, Short Trip (Knitting Factory, 2001)
 Brad Shepik, Drip (Knitting Factory, 2003)
 Edward Simon, A Master's Diary (CAM Jazz, 2012)
 Edward Simon, Sorrows & Triumphs (Sunnyside, 2018)
 Bria Skonberg, With a Twist (Okeh, 2017)
 Stephen Sondheim, Color and Light (Sony 1995)
 Luciana Souza, North and South (Limited Edition, 2003)
 Luciana Souza, The Book of Longing (Sunnyside, 2018)
 Kenny Werner, Democracy Live at the Blue Note (Half Note, 2006)
 Kenny Werner, Lawn Chair Society (Blue Note, 2007)
 Bojan Z, Transpacifik (Label Bleu, 2003)

External links
 Official website
 Personal Biography by Bill Milkowski
 [ Scott Colley] at Allmusic

American jazz double-bassists
Male double-bassists
American jazz composers
Musicians from New York (state)
Jazz musicians from California
1963 births
Living people
CAM Jazz artists
SteepleChase Records artists
Criss Cross Jazz artists
Arabesque Records artists
Palmetto Records artists
21st-century double-bassists
American male jazz composers
21st-century American male musicians
Jazzhole members
ArtistShare artists